Czech Republic national indoor lacrosse team is the national box lacrosse team of the Czech Republic which regularly participates in World Indoor Lacrosse Championship. Team consists of amateur players, who are members of Czech box lacrosse league NBLL. A few Canadian players from the National Lacrosse League with Czech ancestors are also members of this team. Box lacrosse is the most popular form of lacrosse in the Czech Republic, the team has had better results than in field lacrosse.

World Indoor Lacrosse Championship

Czechs took part in the first World Indoor Lacrosse Championship (WILC) ever, held in Canada in 2003. They were overmatched by the international competition, but since they have become the best European box lacrosse national team. In 2007 they still weren't able to get to the semi-finals and finished in 7th place. In 2008, the Czech Republic was chosen as the host of 2011 WILC. Jim Veltman, one of the greatest lacrosse players of all time, became the Head Coach for this tournament. The Czech team showed plenty of improvements in Prague and they were able to beat England in the quarter-finals. In the semi-finals, they met the Iroquois Nationals, but this team was out of their powers. Although they lost to Team USA in the bronze medal game too, they presented themselves well and finished as the best European team.

Roster

2011 FIL World Indoor Lacrosse Championship roster

External links
Official website of Czech Republic

National sports teams of the Czech Republic
National lacrosse teams
National